is a town in Iwate Prefecture, Japan. , the town had an estimated population of 33,090, in 12338 households, and a population density of 134 persons per km².

Geography
Shiwa is located in central Iwate Prefecture, in the Kitakami River basin, south of the prefectural capital of Morioka. The Sannōkai Dam is located in Shiwa.

Neighboring municipalities
Iwate Prefecture
Morioka
Hanamaki
Shizukuishi
Yahaba

Climate
Shiwa has a humid oceanic climate (Köppen climate classification Cfa) characterized by mild summers and cold winters.  The average annual temperature in Shiwa is 10.3 °C. The average annual rainfall is 1326 mm with September as the wettest month and February as the driest month. The temperatures are highest on average in August, at around 24.0 °C, and lowest in January, at around -2.3 °C.

Demographics
Per Japanese census data, the population of Shiwa has remained relatively steady over the past 70 years.

History
The area of present-day Shiwa was part of ancient Mutsu Province, and has been settled since at least the Jōmon period. The area was inhabited by the Emishi people, and came under the control of the Yamato dynasty during the early Heian period. During the Kamakura period, the area was ruled by a branch of the Northern Fujiwara, followed by the Shiba clan during the Muromachi period. During the Sengoku period, the area was conquered by the Nambu clan in 1588. During the Edo period, Shiwa prospered as a post station on the Ōshū Kaidō highway connecting Edo with the northern provinces, as well as from its location on the Kitakami River. Initially part of Morioka Domain under the Tokugawa shogunate, from 1684, four villages (Tsuchidate, Katayose, Inato and Kamihirazawa) formed an exclave of Hachinohe Domain.

During the Meiji period, this exclave became the village of Shiwa, and the town of Hizume and the villages of Furudate, Mizuwake, Akaishi, Hikobe, Sahinai, Akasawa, ane Nagaoka were established within Shiwa District on April 1, 1889 with the establishment of the modern municipalities system. These municipalities were merged on April 1, 1955 to form the new town of Shiwa.

Government
Shiwa has a mayor-council form of government with a directly elected mayor and a unicameral city legislature of 18 members. Shiwa, and the town of Yahaba collectively contribute two seats to the Iwate Prefectural legislature. In terms of national politics, the city is part of Iwate 1st district of the lower house of the Diet of Japan.

Economy
The local economy of Shiwa is traditionally based on agriculture, primarily rice cultivation, apples, grapes and cucumbers; however, due to its proximity to Morioka city, it is increasingly serving as a bedroom community.

Education
Shiwa has eleven public elementary schools and three public junior high schools operated by the town government and one public high school operated by the Iwate Prefectural Board of Education.

Transportation

Railway
 East Japan Railway Company (JR East) - Tōhoku Main Line
  –  –

Highway
  – Takizawa Interchange

International relations
 – Southern Downs, Queensland, Australia 
 - Portage, Michigan, United States

Notable people from Shiwa
Toru Yoshida, professional soccer player

References

External links

Official Website 

 
Towns in Iwate Prefecture